USS Howard has been the name of than one United States Navy ship, and may refer to:

 , a destroyer in commission from 1920 to 1922 and, as destroyer-minesweeper USS Howard (DMS-7), from 1940 to 1945
 , a guided-missile destroyer in commission since 2001

See also
 

United States Navy ship names